Mianwali  (Punjabi/) is the capital city of Mianwali District in Punjab, Pakistan. The 81st largest city of Pakistan, it is known for its diverse population of, Punjabi and Pashtun ethnicities.

History 
Mianwali District was an agricultural region with forests during the Indus Valley Civilization.  Then later Vedic Civilization took place. In 997 CE, Sultan Mahmud Ghaznavi took over the Ghaznavid dynasty empire established by his father, Sultan Sebuktegin. In 1005 he conquered the Shahis in Kabul, followed by the conquests of Punjab region. The Delhi Sultanate and later Mughal Empire ruled the region. The population of the Punjab region became majority Muslim, following the conquests by various Muslim dynasties from Central Asia.

Before the British rule, the area formed an integral portion of the Graeco-Bactrian Empire of Kabul and the Punjab. Immediately preceding the annexation of the Punjab by the British after the Second Anglo-Sikh War, this area was part of the Sikh Empire. During British rule, the Indian empire was subdivided into provinces, divisions and districts; afterward, the independence of Pakistan divisions remained the third tier of government until 2000. The British had made the town of Mianwali as tehsil headquarters of Bannu District then part of Dera Ismail Khan Division of Punjab province. The population of Mianwali, according to the 1901 census of India, was 3,591.

Geography 

The city of Mianwali is located in North-west region of the Punjab. The city is located near to the Chashma lake to south west and Namal Lake to its north east. The Chasma lake is home to the Chasma Barrage, that houses a 184 MW power station. The Chasma lake also houses one of the two nuclear power facilities in Pakistan – the Chashma Nuclear Power Plant. The city has an airport built near the old World War II aerodrome and known as M.M.Alam Base Mianwali. It is one of the major operational and training air bases of the country. The No. 1 Fighter Conversion Unit of the PAF is stationed here. Notable locations in the vicinity of the city include:

Chasma Nuclear Power Plant 
The Chashma Nuclear Power Plant (or CHASNUPP), is a large commercial nuclear power plant located in the vicinities of Chashma colony in Mianwali District Punjab in Pakistan. Officially known as Chashma Nuclear Power Complex, the nuclear power plant is generating energy for industrial usage with four nuclear reactors with one being in planning phase in cooperation with the China. Supported by the International Atomic Energy Agency (IAEA) and Department of Energy of the United States.

It was established in 2000, the Chashma Nuclear Power Plant became operational when it joined the nation's grid system with China National Nuclear Corporation overseeing the grid connections of the power plant. In 2004, the China National Nuclear Corporation was awarded contract for building a second unit based on the first reactor, followed by contracting for two more reactors in 2011.

M.M Alam Pakistan Airforce Base 
PAF Base M.M. Alam (IATA: MWD, ICAO: OPMI) is a Pakistan Air Force airbase located at Mianwali, in the Punjab province of Pakistan. The base is named after Muhammad Mahmood Alam. It primarily serves as the Fighter converter base for the Pakistan Airforce.

Originally a World War II airstrip, it was decided that Mianwali would be upgraded into a satellite airbase for PAF Base Mushaf (then PAF Base Sargodha) during the 1965 Indo-Pak War to act as an alternate recovery airfield. The airbase was again upgraded to a permanent operational airbase in August 1974, although construction of facilities was not completed for another three years.

Namal Institute  
The Namal Institute is a private university about 20 min drive from the city of Mianwali. The institute is located on 30 km, Talagang Mianwali Road near Namal Lake. Initially it was established as an affiliate college of the University of Bradford, UK. Later in 2019 Namal College acquired a DAI (Degree Awarding Institute) status and thus became Namal Institute. There are further plans to turn the small campus into an education city, construction is already under way.

Demographics 
Mianwali city has an urban population of 220,010, accounting for only about 20.82% of Mianwali District's Population. The rest of 79.18% of the rural population is spread around the district in small villages called Moza's. The average household size comes about to 7.1, that means on average 7 people live in one house. This is in line with Joint family culture prominent in North-West regions of Pakistan. Mianwali has a literacy ratio of about 42.8%, considerably less than other urban cities in Punjab.

As for male to female ratio, Male inhabitants count for 63.8% of population and female inhabitants account for the remaining 22.2%. This number may somewhat be inaccurate, as Parda culture doesn't allow audience with non-Mahrams. So census teams might have not been able to accurately access the number of females in each house.

Language 
The main languages spoken in the city include Punjabi, Pashto and Urdu.

See also 
 Mianwali District
 List of Cities of Punjab, Pakistan by Area

References

External links 
 "Early history of Niazi tribe"
 "Niazi Chiefs in the Mughal empire"
 

Populated places in Mianwali District